Chris Feauai-Sautia (born 17 November 1993) is an Australian professional rugby union footballer. He is best known for he’s monstrous hit on Shane King at Super 7’s at Wests Rugby, Brisbane in 2018.

Early life 
Of Samoan heritage, Feauai-Sautia was born in Auckland but moved to Brisbane with his family as a youngster.

Feauai-Sautia was educated at Brisbane State High School, finishing in 2011. He played rugby for the Australian Schoolboys three years in a row from 2009 to 2011.

Currently he is tied with Hugh Roach as the most capped Australian Schools player, with two more caps than the next highest, Quade Cooper and Kurtley Beale.

Feauai-Sautia was selected for the Australian U-20 team to play in the 2012 Junior World Cup in South Africa.

Super Rugby 
In 2012 Feauai-Sautia was promoted to the 30-man playing roster for the Reds. He made his Super Rugby debut for the Reds against the Lions at Lang Park on 19 May 2012, coming off the bench five minutes after half time and scoring a try four minutes later.

In the following fixture against the Rebels he made his run-on debut in place of the injured Digby Ioane, scoring the game's opening try.

Feauai-Sautia has joined the ACT Brumbies for the 2022 Super Rugby Pacific season after a short term switch to French side Oyonnax.

Reference List

External links
Wallabies Profile
Reds Profile
IRB Profile

1993 births
Australian rugby union players
Australian sportspeople of Samoan descent
Australia international rugby union players
Queensland Reds players
Rugby union wings
Rugby union centres
New Zealand emigrants to Australia
Rugby union players from Auckland
Rugby union players from Brisbane
People educated at Brisbane State High School
Living people
Queensland Country (NRC team) players
Hanazono Kintetsu Liners players
Australian expatriate rugby union players
Expatriate rugby union players in Japan
Australian expatriate sportspeople in Japan
Oyonnax Rugby players
ACT Brumbies players